Route 27 is a state highway in New Jersey, United States. It runs  from U.S. Route 206 (US 206) in Princeton, Mercer County northeast to an interchange with Route 21 (McCarter Highway) and Broad Street in Newark, Essex County. The route passes through many communities along the way, including New Brunswick, Highland Park, Edison, Metuchen, Rahway, and Elizabeth. Route 27 is a two- to four-lane undivided highway for most of its length, passing through a variety of urban and suburban environments. It intersects many roads along the way, including Route 18 in New Brunswick, Interstate 287 (I-287) in Edison, the Garden State Parkway in Woodbridge Township, Route 35 in Rahway, Route 28 in Elizabeth, and U.S. Route 22 in Newark. Route 27 crosses the Raritan River on the Albany Street Bridge, which connects Highland Park on the east with New Brunswick on the west.

Route 27 was part of the alignment through New Jersey of the Lincoln Highway, the United States' first transcontinental highway that was established in 1913. Route 27 is still referred to as the Lincoln Highway in many municipalities, such as Edison Township. The Lincoln Highway became part of pre-1927 Route 1 between New Brunswick and Elizabeth in 1916 and pre-1927 Route 13 between Trenton and New Brunswick in 1917. In 1927, the Lincoln Highway was renumbered as Route 27 between Trenton and Newark. U.S. Route 1 was designated on this portion of the road until it was relocated by the 1940s. U.S. Route 206 followed the route from Trenton to Princeton until 1953, when the southern terminus of Route 27 was cut back to Princeton to avoid the concurrency with U.S. Route 206.

Route description

Mercer County

Route 27 begins at a traffic light with U.S. Route 206 and County Route 533 in downtown Princeton, Mercer County. The route heads northeast along Nassau Street, the main street of Princeton that runs along the northern edge of Princeton University and is lined with numerous shops and restaurants. This portion of Route 27 sees between 10,000 and 20,000 cars a day. Just past the beginning of Route 27, County Route 583 heads to the southwest on Mercer Street. Route 27 moves through downtown Princeton, passing by the main gates to Princeton University near Nassau Hall, and intersecting County Route 571 (Washington Road, also signed as County Route 526). After leaving the downtown area, Route 27 continues through residential areas and the route becomes Princeton-Kingston Road. Route 27 runs parallel to Carnegie Lake, then crosses over the Millstone River just north of the historic Kingston Bridge.  The portion of the road from Princeton to Kingston is part of the King's Highway Historic District.

Middlesex/Somerset County border
Upon crossing the Millstone River, Route 27 runs along the border of Franklin Township, Somerset County to the west and South Brunswick Township, Middlesex County to the east, passing through the historic community of Kingston. It continues northeast through a mix of woodland and residences, intersecting Promenade Boulevard, which heads east and becomes County Route 522 after crossing U.S. Route 1. Route 27 briefly runs entirely into Somerset County before resuming along the Middlesex/Somerset County border. The route continues north to an intersection with County Route 518 (Gateway Boulevard), where it resumes its northeast direction and heads into Kendall Park as a variable two- to four-lane road, entering denser suburban development. In Kendall Park, the road passes northwest of a park and ride lot located at a shopping center. Route 27 then passes through Franklin Park, intersecting County Route 610 (Henderson Road). Past that intersection, Route 27 forms the border of Franklin Township to the west and North Brunswick Township to the east, passing through suburban development with some areas of farmland, seeing about 38,487 cars a day. The road forms the border of Franklin Township and New Brunswick upon intersecting County Route 680 (How Lane) becoming four-lane Somerset Street. Route 27 follows Somerset Street northeast through residential and commercial areas, passing by the community of Somerset on the west side of the road.

Middlesex County

The route splits from Somerset Street and heads entirely into New Brunswick, Middlesex County along French Street. At the Sandford Street intersection, Route 27 becomes a county-maintained road that is also signed as County Route 644. It then intersects County Route 693 (Jersey Avenue), which heads to the southwest to become Route 91. Past this intersection, the route becomes a two-lane street that heads into downtown New Brunswick, south of the main campus of Rutgers University. Here, the route has a daily traffic count of approximately 11,559 vehicles. It crosses under Amtrak's Northeast Corridor rail line adjacent to the New Brunswick station serving Amtrak and NJ Transit's Northeast Corridor Line. The route turns into a four-lane divided highway and intersects County Route 527 (Easton Avenue). At this point, County Route 644 ends, with Route 27 forming a brief concurrency with County Route 527, heading east along Albany Street as a city-maintained street. About  later, the road crosses George Street, which heads to the north as County Route 672 and to the south as Route 171. County Route 527 splits from Albany Street by heading south on Route 171 while Route 27 continues east. After another , Route 27 intersects with County Route 514, Johnson Drive. Route 27 continues along Albany St. as a concurrency with County Route 514. It immediately interchanges with Route 18 (Memorial Parkway). At the Route 18 interchange, Route 27 becomes state-maintained again, crossing the Raritan River on the Albany Street Bridge into Highland Park.

Upon entering Highland Park, Route 27 becomes two-lane Raritan Avenue, intersecting County Route 622 (River Road) and continuing through the downtown area of Highland Park. County Route 514 splits from Route 27 by heading east on Woodbridge Avenue  later. Route 27 resumes heading northeast past this intersection as a four-lane road that passes by homes, entering Edison Township, where the name changes to Lincoln Highway. The route continues northeast, intersecting County Route 676 (Suttons Lane/Duclos Lane) and County Route 529 (Plainfield Avenue), then travels through a mix of residences and businesses, briefly becoming a divided highway before intersecting Interstate 287 at a partial interchange with access to southbound Interstate 287 and from northbound Interstate 287. At this interchange, Route 27 sees approximately 14,386 cars a day. Beyond this interchange, Route 27 crosses into Metuchen and becomes two-lane Essex Avenue, which turns to the east and heads through residential areas. The route turns north onto Lake Street and intersects County Route 501 (Amboy Avenue), forming a concurrency with that route. It passes under the Northeast Corridor and comes to Middlesex Avenue, where County Route 501 turns to the left and Route 27 turns to the right to resume its northeast direction.

Route 27 intersects County Route 531 (Main Street) after  and continues northeast on Middlesex Avenue, passing through a residential environment where the route carries about 22,414 vehicles daily. The road comes to a bridge over Conrail Shared Assets Operations' (CSAO) Port Reading Secondary line. The route crosses back into Edison Township and becomes the Lincoln Highway again, passing over the Rahway River. It heads through business areas and passes near the Thomas Alva Edison Memorial Tower and Museum, which is located on the site of Thomas Edison's Menlo Park laboratory. The route closely parallels the Northeast Corridor rail line and crosses into Woodbridge Township, widening to four lanes at this point. Route 27 passes by the Metropark station serving Amtrak and NJ Transit trains and interchanges with the Garden State Parkway near Iselin, where approximately 19,780 vehicles travel on Route 27 on a daily basis. Past the Garden State Parkway, Route 27 narrows back to two lanes and continues northeast alongside the Northeast Corridor, passing through a mix of residential and commercial development as a three-lane road with two northbound lanes and one southbound lane.

Union and Essex counties
Route 27 crosses into Rahway, Union County and intersects the northern terminus of Route 35. Route 27 continues north using four-lane St. Georges Avenue. The route passes through Rahway, passing by residences and businesses. In Rahway, the route sees about 25,022 cars a day. It continues northeast, intersecting multiple county routes, such as County Route 602 (West Inman Avenue), County Route 621 (Hazelwood Avenue), County Route 608 (Milton Street), and County Route 613 (Westfield Avenue/West Grand Avenue).  The route crosses into Linden when passing Stuart Place, where the route heads through a more commercial setting with businesses lining both sides of the road. In Linden, the road intersects County Route 615 (North Stiles Street). At the intersection with County Route 617 (Wood Avenue), Route 27 forms the border of Roselle to the west and Linden to the east, with about 23,081 vehicles using the road on a daily basis The route crosses the inactive Rahway Valley Railroad line that is owned by the Staten Island Railway. It passes by Warinaco Park and forms the border between Elizabeth to the west and Linden to the east before entirely entering Elizabeth at the Richford Terrace intersection.

In Elizabeth, Route 27 narrows to two lanes and becomes Rahway Avenue, crossing Route 439 and continuing to the northeast through residential and commercial areas. Route 27 splits into a one-way pair with northbound Route 27 following Rahway Avenue east and turning north onto Cherry Street and southbound Route 27 following Westfield Avenue west and turning south onto Chilton Avenue. The southbound direction of Route 27 intersects the eastern terminus of Route 28, where that route continues west on Westfield Avenue. Past the one-way pair, Route 27 resumes east on four-lane Westfield Avenue, turning north onto Broad Street. The route heads into a more urbanized setting and continues northeast onto Newark Avenue, intersecting the northern terminus of Route 439. Through Elizabeth, about 10,000 to 20,000 vehicles travel on Route 27 every day.

Route 27 crosses into Newark, Essex County at the Virginia Street intersection, where it becomes Frelinghuysen Avenue, a road that heads north through the Dayton neighborhood of Newark, passing through urban areas and by Weequahic Park. Route 27 interchanges with U.S. Route 22 and immediately passes under Interstate 78. Route 27 continues north, passing under railroad tracks carrying CSAO's Lehigh Line and NJ Transit's Raritan Valley Line and crossing CSAO's Poinier Street Lead line/Irvington-Hillside Industrial Branch at-grade,  before it comes to an intersection with Poinier Street, where the route heads east along that road to its northern terminus at an interchange with Route 21 and Broad Street.

History 
 
The southern part of Route 27 follows the Lenape Assunpink Trail that during the colonial era was known as the Old Dutch Trail, and later became the Kings Highway. North of Rahway, the road was created as Queen Anne's Road, running from Perth Amboy to Elizabethtown Point, with later extensions to Newark and Jersey City. This road would have several names over the following years: it was renamed the King's Highway when it was extended by King George to Jersey City, then to the Post Road during the Revolutionary War, then the Old Country Road after, then finally St. George's Avenue when Rahway was incorporated as a city.

Route 27 follows portions of several 19th-century turnpikes, including the Essex and Middlesex Turnpike, which was chartered on March 3, 1806, to run from New Brunswick to Newark along what is today Route 27, the Northeast Corridor rail line, and Broad Street in Newark, the Georgetown and Franklin Turnpike, chartered on February 15, 1816, to run from Lambertville to New Brunswick along the present-day alignments of County Route 518 and Route 27, the Newark and Elizabeth Plank Road, chartered on March 14, 1856, and the Princeton and Kingston Branch Turnpike, chartered on December 3, 1807, to run from Trenton to Kingston along current County Route 583 and Route 27. The route became a portion of the Lincoln Highway, the United States' first transcontinental highway that was established in 1913 to run from New York City to San Francisco. It is still known by that name in a few places along the route, particularly in Edison Township.

In 1916, the Lincoln Highway was legislated as part of pre-1927 Route 1 between New Brunswick and Elizabeth and as pre-1927 Route 13 between Trenton and New Brunswick in 1917. In the 1927 New Jersey state highway renumbering, Route 27 was designated to run from Trenton to the intersection of Frelinghuysen Avenue and Astor Street in Newark, replacing the portions of Routes 1 and 13 that ran along the Lincoln Highway. With the creation of the U.S. Highway System, U.S. Route 1 was designated along the length of Route 27 from 1927 until sometime before the 1940s, when the U.S. Route 1 designation was moved to Route 26, Route S26, and Route 25 between Trenton and Newark. U.S. Route 206 was designated along the portion of route between Trenton and Princeton by the 1940s. In the 1953 New Jersey state highway renumbering, the southern terminus of Route 27 was cut back to Princeton to avoid the U.S. Route 206 concurrency.

Major intersections

See also

References

External links 

 New Jersey Roads: Route 27
 New Jersey Highway Ends: Route 27
 Speed Limits for Route 27

Transportation in Essex County, New Jersey
Transportation in Mercer County, New Jersey
Transportation in Middlesex County, New Jersey
Transportation in Somerset County, New Jersey
Transportation in Union County, New Jersey
027
Lincoln Highway